Virot is a French surname. It may refer to:

 Andree Virot (1905 - 2010), French spy and Resistance member
 Alex Virot (1890 - 1957), French sports journalist
 Charles François de Virot de Sombreuil (1725 - 1794), French general
 Robert Virot (1915 - 2002), French botanist